Tally-Syza (Tallıhıźa) is a rural locality (a selo) in Urmanayevsky Selsoviet, Bakalinsky District, Bashkortostan, Russia. The population was 147 as of 2010. There are 3 streets.

Geography 
Tally-Syza is located 33 km southwest of Bakaly (the district's administrative centre) by road. Sarly is the nearest rural locality.

References 

Rural localities in Bakalinsky District